Elizabeth of Hungary (1236 – 24 October 1271) was a daughter of King Béla IV of Hungary and his wife Maria Laskarina. She was a member of the House of Árpad.

Marriage 
Elizabeth and her sisters were all to marry well. Elizabeth married in 1250 to Henry XIII, Duke of Bavaria. The couple were married for twenty-one years and had ten children:
 Agnes of Wittelsbach (January 1254 – 20 October 1315). Joined the Cistercian Monastery at Seligenthal as a nun. 
 Agnes of Wittelsbach (17 July 1255 – 10 May 1260). She shared her name with her older sister. 
 Agnes of Wittelsbach (29 October 1256 – 16 November 1260). She shared her name with her two older sisters.
 Elizabeth of Wittelsbach (23 April 1258 – 8 August 1314). Joined the Cistercian Monastery at Seligenthal as a nun.
 Otto III, Duke of Bavaria (11 February 1261 – 9 November 1312). 
 Henry of Wittelsbach (23 February 1262 – 16 September 1280). 
 Sophie of Wittelsbach (c. 1264 – 4 February 1282). Married Poppo VIII, Count of Henneberg.
 Catherine of Wittelsbach (9 June 1267 – 9 January 1310). Married Friedrich Tuta, Margrave of Meissen. 
 Louis III, Duke of Bavaria (9 October 1269 – 9 October 1296). 
 Stephen I, Duke of Bavaria (14 March 1271 – 10 December 1310).

Elizabeth died in 1271, and was thus outlived by her husband and eight of her children. Elizabeth is buried at Kloster Seligenthal.

Ancestry

References

1236 births
1271 deaths
House of Árpád
13th-century Hungarian people
13th-century Hungarian women
13th-century Polish people
13th-century Polish women
Daughters of kings